Rose-colored glasses or rose-tinted glasses may refer to:

 Optimism, the tendency to see things in a positive light
 Rosy retrospection, the tendency to view past events in a positive (often unrealistic) light

Music
 "Rose Coloured Glasses", a song by Hans Poulsen, recorded by John Farnham (1968)
 Rose Colored Glasses (album), by John Conlee (1978)
 "Rose Colored Glasses" (John Conlee song), its title track
 "Rose-Coloured Glasses", a song on the album Outskirts by Blue Rodeo (1987)
 "Rose Colored Glasses" (Kelly Rowland song) (2010)
 "Rose Colored Glasses", a song on School of Fish's 1991 self-titled debut album
 "Rose Colored Glasses", a section of the song "The Whirlwind" on Transatlantic's 2009 The Whirlwind (album)

See also
Cynicism (contemporary) 
Pessimism
The Rose Tint, 2001 album by David Dallas
Rose Tinted Enterprises, an Australian production company
Skepticism
La Vie en rose (disambiguation)